Anthony Johnson (February 1, 1966 – September 6, 2021), sometimes credited as A. J. Johnson, was an American actor and comedian. He was best known for his role as "Ezal" in the 1995 comedy film Friday.

Career
Born in Compton, California, his father Eddie Smith was a stuntman and a co-founder of the Black Stuntmen's Association. Johnson had credited his father for helping him enter the film industry, by getting him to work in film productions. He had also credited the comedian Robin Harris for helping him earlier on in his career as a stand-up comedian and giving him another chance even when he was jeered for his bad performance.

Johnson began acting in his early twenties. In 1990, he landed a starring role as E.Z.E. in House Party, after which he started doing stand-up in bars in Los Angeles. He later appeared in Lethal Weapon 3 as a drug dealer and in Menace II Society. His biggest role was in the 1995 comedy Friday, as Ezal, a crackhead and thief. He also appeared in Panther, The Players Club, B*A*P*S, I Got the Hook-Up, Def Jam's How to Be a Player and Repos, and in rap videos: in Dr. Dre's "Dre Day" (1992), he played Sleazy-E, a parody of Eazy-E, and he appeared again as Sleazy-E in the video for Eazy-E's "Real Muthaphuckkin G's" (1993), this time being assaulted.

Personal life
Johnson has three daughters, no children with his ex-wife. He also had two siblings: a brother named Edward Smith, and a sister named Sheila.

In July 2009, it was reported that Johnson had a heart attack at LaGuardia Airport while on his way to a comedy show. However, Johnson said in 2018 that it was instead a panic attack.

Johnson died on September 6, 2021, aged 55, at a Los Angeles County hospital, after being found unresponsive in a store. His death was publicly announced on September 20 by his representative LyNea Bell. Johnson died of multi-system organ failure stemming from chronic ethanol use according to his autopsy report. It also stated that he had contracted COVID-19 but was asymptomatic.

Filmography

Film

Television

References

External links

1965 births
2021 deaths
African-American male actors
African-American male comedians
American male television actors
American male comedians
American male film actors
People from Compton, California
Male actors from California
Comedians from California
21st-century American comedians
21st-century African-American people
20th-century African-American people
Burials at Rose Hills Memorial Park